Rugby union in Slovenia is a minor but growing sport.  they are currently ranked 71st by the World Rugby governing body.

Governing body
The governing body is Rugby Zveza Slovenije (Rugby Union of Slovenia).

History

Yugoslav period

Rugby union was a moderately popular sport in Yugoslavia. Although rugby union in Croatia was the main centre for the sport in Yugoslavia, there was still quite a bit of rugby played in Slovenia. The Rugby Championship of Yugoslavia ran from 1957-1991.

Post independence
The breakup of Yugoslavia broke up many of the Slovenian rugby structures, which had to be started afresh.

In the early 1990s, former Italian cap, Dr Giancarlo Tizanini was a major driving force in Austrian rugby. Before his death in 1994, he tried hard to establish a Central European equivalent of the Six Nations between Austria, Hungary, Croatia, Slovenia and Bosnia.

Slovenia also borders Italy, which is a major rugby playing nation. In recent years, however, there have been serious attempts by rugby league to expand into the Balkans, using substantial financial incentives, and expats from Australia.

Clubs
As of 2009, the following clubs were active:

 RAK Olimpija
 RFC BEŽIGRAD
 RFC Doberman
 RFC Emoona
 RFC Maribor
 RFC Ribnica
 RFC Ris
 RK Ljubljana
 RK Sokol Maribor(Maribor Sokol)
 VRK Hermes (Veterans Rugby Club)

See also
 Slovenia national rugby union team

References

External links
 IRB Slovenia page
 official union page
 FIRA AER Slovenia page
 RAK Olimpija
 RFC BEŽIGRAD
 RK Ljubljana